The 1986 All-Ireland Under-21 Hurling Championship was the 23rd staging of the All-Ireland Under-21 Hurling Championship since its establishment by the Gaelic Athletic Association in 1964.

Tipperary were the defending champions, however, they were beaten by Limerick in the Munster semi-final.

On 14 September 1986, Galway won the championship following a 0-14 to 2-5 defeat of Wexford in the All-Ireland final. This was their fourth All-Ireland title in the under-21 grade and their first in three championship seasons.

Results

Leinster Under-21 Hurling Championship

Quarter-finals

Semi-finals

Finals

Munster Under-21 Hurling Championship

Quarter-finals

Semi-finals

Final

All-Ireland Under-21 Hurling Championship

Semi-finals

Final

Championship statistics

Miscellaneous

 Derry won the Ulster Championship for the first time in their history.
 Limerick won the Munster Championship for the first time in their history.
 The All-Ireland semi-final clash between Derry and Galway remains their only ever championship meeting.

References

Under
All-Ireland Under-21 Hurling Championship